Chonerhinos naritus, the bronze pufferfish or yellow pufferfish, is a species of pufferfish native to Southeast Asia, where mainly found in estuarine and coastal habitats. This species grows to a length of  TL, but otherwise it generally resembles the smaller and more strictly freshwater Auriglobus pufferfish. This predatory species feeds on other fish, crustaceans (both crabs and shrimp) and snails.

Taxonomy
C. naritus is the only species in the genus Chonerhinos, but the synonym Xenopterus was formerly used instead. At that point the genus name Chonerhinos was used for the species modestus and its relatives, but this was incorrect and they were moved to Auriglobus in 1999.

Notes

References
 

Tetraodontidae
Taxa named by Pieter Bleeker
Fish described in 1854
Monotypic ray-finned fish genera